Mahaut of Albon (1112–1148), was a Countess Consort of Savoy by marriage to Amadeus III, Count of Savoy.

Life
She was the eldest daughter of Guigues III of Albon and Matilda of Hauteville. The marriage was arranged as an alliance with the counts of Geneva and her own family. Amadeus III had no heir after his first spouse, who died in 1134. The wedding took place in 1135. 

She is noted as the countess of Savoy when she acted as a donor to the convent in Ripalta on 9 January 1137. She made donations to other convents, such as the convent of San Maurizio d'Agauno in 1143. When she gave birth to an heir in 1136, Savoy was spared a succession crisis. Because of her marriage alliance, her father assisted her spouse in the military expedition in Grésivaudan in 1140, and died in battle in 1142. Mahaut died prior to the departure of her spouse in the Second crusade.

Legacy
According to tradition, she was the founder of the charity establishment Pain de mai, which provided food to people during famine.

Issue

 Mafalda (1125–1158), married king Afonso I of Portugal
 Agnes of Savoy (1125–1172), married William I, Count of Geneva
 Humbert III (1136–1188)
 John of Savoy
 Peter of Savoy
 William of Savoy
 Margaret of Savoy (died 1157)
 Isabella of Savoy
 Juliana of Savoy (died 1194), abbess of St. André-le-Haut

References

1112 births
1148 deaths
12th-century French people
12th-century Italian nobility
12th-century French women
Countesses of Savoy
12th-century Italian women